Jonatan Eccehomo Romero Preciado (born December 14, 1986 in Cali, Colombia) is a Colombian boxer best known to qualify for the Olympics 2008 at bantamweight. His name is sometimes spelled Jonathan or Jhonatan in press reports but not by the major Colombian media.

Amateur career
Romero who is known by his nickname 'Momo' hails from a boxing family from the "El Retiro" neighbourhood of Santiago de Cali in the Valle del Cauca region.
His older brother René, a national amateur champion himself, was shot in 2002.

Romero won bronze at the Boxing at the 2006 Central American and Caribbean Games where he lost his semifinal to Guillermo Rigondeaux by walkover but didn't participate in the 2007 PanAmerican games due to a shoulder injury.

At the 2007 World Amateur Boxing Championships he bested Chawazi Chatsygov, PanAm Games silver medalist Claudio Marrero 19:3 but lost to McJoe Arroyo 9:23. 
By reaching the quarterfinals he joined teammate Darley Perez in qualifying for Beijing 2008.

Professional career
His record is (23-1, 12 KOs).

He won the IBF Super Bantamweight on February 16, 2013 against Alejandro Lopez (24-3, 7 KOs) to claim the vacant title.

He lost his title in an upset against Kiko Martinez on August 17, 2013 by TKO.

External links

 Central American Games 2006
 World Championships 2007
 Colombian Nationals 2007
 El Tiempo article 

1986 births
Living people
Bantamweight boxers
International Boxing Federation champions
Boxers at the 2008 Summer Olympics
Olympic boxers of Colombia
Colombian male boxers
Central American and Caribbean Games bronze medalists for Colombia
Competitors at the 2006 Central American and Caribbean Games
Central American and Caribbean Games medalists in boxing
Sportspeople from Cali
21st-century Colombian people